Armstrong Creek is a tributary of the Kanawha River,  long, in southern West Virginia in the United States. The creek flows for its entire length in western Fayette County; its tributaries additionally drain a small portion of eastern Kanawha County.

Both headwaters forks flow generally north-northwestward, and from their confluence Armstrong Creek flows generally north-northeastward through the unincorporated communities of Elkridge, Powellton, Columbia, and Kimberly, to Mount Carbon, where it flows into the Kanawha River. The creek is paralleled by county roads for most of its course.

The Geographic Names Information System lists "Armstrong's Creek" as a historical variant name for the creek.

See also
List of rivers of West Virginia

References 

Rivers of West Virginia
Rivers of Fayette County, West Virginia
Tributaries of the Kanawha River